Kanor is a district of Bojonegoro Regency, East Java, Indonesia.

Administration
Kanor consists of 25 administrative villages.

References

Districts of East Java
Solo River
Bojonegoro Regency